Laughing Man may refer to:

 "The Laughing Man" (short story), a 1949 short story by J.D. Salinger
 Laughing Man (Ghost in the Shell), a fictional character in the anime series Ghost in the Shell: Stand Alone Complex
 Der lachende Mann – Bekenntnisse eines Mörders (The Laughing Man – Confessions of a Murderer), a 1966 East German film
 Ghost in the Shell: S.A.C. - The Laughing Man, an OVA film based on the anime series
 The Man Who Laughs (L'homme qui rit) or The Laughing Man, a novel by Victor Hugo
 A foundation and coffeehouse founded by Hugh Jackman